In academic publishing, an expression of concern is a notice issued by a publisher against a particular publication, warning that it may contain errors or be otherwise untrustworthy.

Definitions 
Practice for issuing expressions of concern is not standardized across the publishing industry. The International Committee of Medical Journal Editors says in its 2019 recommendations that a publisher may choose to issue an expression of concern while an investigation of alleged scientific misconduct is ongoing, and pending its outcome.

See also 
Erratum
Post-publication peer review
Retractions in academic publishing

Notes

References 

COPE Notes. 
ICMJE. 

Scientific misconduct
Academic publishing
Publishing
Error